Scott Gregory may refer to:
 Scott Gregory (ice skater)
 Scott Gregory (golfer)
 Scott Gregory (rugby union)